Galugah or Galougah is a village in Shuru, in the Kurin District of Zahedan County, Sistan and Baluchestan Province, Iran. At the 2006 census, its population was 830, in 197 families.

References 

Populated places in Zahedan County